Maurice James Connor (died March 22, 1939) was an American football coach. He served as the head football coach at the College of the Holy Cross in Worcester, Massachusetts from 1898 to 1902.

He was an 1896 graduate of Harvard University.

References

Year of birth missing
1939 deaths
Harvard University alumni
Holy Cross Crusaders football coaches